The swimming competition at the 1983 Summer Universiade took place in Edmonton, Alberta, Canada from July 2 to July 7, 1983.

Men's events

Legend:

Women's events

Legend:

References
Medalist Summary (Men) on GBRATHLETICS.com
Medalist Summary (Women) on GBRATHLETICS.com

1983 in swimming
Swimming at the Summer Universiade
1983 Summer Universiade